Charles Kwateng (born 27 May 1997) is a Belgian professional footballer who plays as a forward.

Club career
Kwateng began his career at JMG Academy in Lier, before being transferred to Belgian top-tier side Lierse in 2014 at the age of 17. He made four appearances in the Belgian First Division B European play-offs during the 2016–17 season and was subsequently loaned out to Belgian Second Amateur Division Mandel United in July 2017.

In July 2018, after Lierse filed for bankruptcy, Kwateng moved to Greece, signing for Football League side Ergotelis.

On 1 July 2021, he extended his contract with Ergotelis for two more years.

Career statistics

Club

Notes

References

1997 births
Living people
Belgian footballers
Belgian expatriate footballers
Belgian people of Ghanaian descent
Black Belgian sportspeople
Association football forwards
Challenger Pro League players
Football League (Greece) players
Super League Greece 2 players
Lierse S.K. players
Royal FC Mandel United players
Ergotelis F.C. players
Veria NFC players
Expatriate footballers in Greece
Belgian expatriate sportspeople in Greece
Footballers from Liège